The Cayman worm snake (Cubatyphlops caymanensis) is a species of snake in the Typhlopidae family.

References

Cubatyphlops
Reptiles described in 1940